William, Prince of Wales,  (William Arthur Philip Louis; born 21 June 1982) is the heir apparent to the British throne. He is the elder son of King Charles III and Diana, Princess of Wales.

Born in London, William was educated at Wetherby School, Ludgrove School and Eton College. He earned a Master of Arts degree in geography at the University of St Andrews where he met his future spouse Catherine. William then trained at Royal Military Academy Sandhurst prior to serving with the Blues and Royals. In April 2008, William graduated from Royal Air Force College Cranwell, joining RAF Search and Rescue Force in early 2009. He served as a full-time pilot with the East Anglian Air Ambulance for two years, starting in July 2015.

William performs official duties and engagements on behalf of the British monarch. He holds patronage with over 30 charitable and military organisations, including the Tusk Trust, Centrepoint, The Passage, Wales Air Ambulance and London's Air Ambulance Charity. He undertakes projects through The Royal Foundation, with his charity work revolving around mental health, conservation, and emergency workers. In December 2014, he founded the "United for Wildlife" initiative, which aims to reduce worldwide illegal wildlife trade. In April 2016, William, his wife Catherine and his brother Harry initiated the mental health awareness campaign "Heads Together" to encourage people to open up about their mental health issues. In October 2020, William announced the launch of the Earthshot Prize, a £50 million initiative to incentivise environmental solutions over the next decade .

William was made Duke of Cambridge prior to his marriage to Catherine Middleton in 2011. They have three children: Prince George, Princess Charlotte, and Prince Louis. He became Duke of Cornwall and Duke of Rothesay following his father's accession to the throne on 8 September 2022. The following day, he was made Prince of Wales, the traditional title for the heir apparent to the monarch.

Early life

Prince William was born at St Mary's Hospital, London, on 21 June 1982 as the first child of Charles, Prince of Wales (later King Charles III), and his first wife, Diana, Princess of Wales, during the reign of his grandmother Queen Elizabeth II. Buckingham Palace announced his name, William Arthur Philip Louis, on 28 June. On 4 August, the 82nd birthday of his paternal great-grandmother, Queen Elizabeth The Queen Mother, he was christened in the Music Room of Buckingham Palace by the Archbishop of Canterbury, Robert Runcie.

William was the first child born to a prince and princess of Wales since Prince John was born to Prince George and Princess Mary (later King George V and Queen Mary) in 1905. When he was nine months old, William accompanied his parents on their 1983 tour of Australia and New Zealand, as his first trip overseas. It marked the first time that a royal baby was taken on an overseas tour. William's younger brother, Prince Harry, was born in 1984. William and Harry were raised at Kensington Palace in London, and Highgrove House in Gloucestershire.

Known informally as "Wills" within the family, William was nicknamed "Willy" by his brother and "Wombat" by his mother. Diana wished her sons to obtain broader and more typical life experiences beyond royal upbringing, taking them to Walt Disney World, McDonald's, AIDS clinics, and shelters for the homeless. A "rambunctious" and "bratty" child, biographer Robert Lacey asserts that William grew "more reflective" with a "noticeably quiet character" as he began boarding school. Diana was reported to have described William as "my little wise old man" on whom she started to rely as her confidant by his early teens.

William carried out his first public engagement while accompanying his parents on a visit to Llandaff on Saint David's Day in 1991. He and Harry travelled to Canada on an official visit with their parents in 1991 and again with Prince Charles in 1998. William's parents divorced in 1996. Diana died in a car accident in the early hours of 31 August 1997. William, then aged 15, together with his 12-year-old brother and their father, was staying at Balmoral Castle at the time. The following morning, Prince Charles informed William and Harry of their mother's death. William was reportedly uncertain as to whether he should walk behind his mother's coffin during the funeral procession. His grandfather Prince Philip, Duke of Edinburgh, told him: "If you don't walk, I think you'll regret it later. If I walk, will you walk with me?" At the funeral, William and Harry walked alongside their father, grandfather, and maternal uncle, Charles Spencer, 9th Earl Spencer, behind the funeral cortège from Kensington Palace to Westminster Abbey.

After his mother's death, William stated that he was "in a state of shock for many years." William and his brother Harry inherited the majority of the £12.9 million left by their mother on their respective 30th birthdays, a figure that had grown to £10 million each in 2014. In 2014, the brothers inherited their mother's wedding dress along with many other of her personal possessions including dresses, diamond tiaras, jewels, letters, and paintings. The brothers also received the original lyrics and score of "Candle in the Wind" by Bernie Taupin and Elton John as performed by John at Diana's funeral. In 2002, The Times reported that William and his brother would also share £4.9 million from trust funds established by their great-grandmother, Queen Elizabeth The Queen Mother, on their respective 21st birthdays, as well as £8 million upon their respective 40th birthdays.

Education
William was educated at private schools, starting at Jane Mynors' nursery school and the pre-preparatory Wetherby School, both in London. Following this, he attended Ludgrove School near Wokingham, Berkshire, and was privately tutored during summers by Rory Stewart. At Ludgrove, he participated in football, swimming, basketball, clay pigeon shooting, and cross country running. He was subsequently admitted to Eton College, studying geography, biology, and history of art at A-Level. He obtained an 'A' in geography, a 'C' in biology, and a 'B' in history of art. William became captain of the swimming team and his house football team at Eton, also taking up water polo.

The decision to place William at Eton went against the family tradition of sending royal children to Gordonstoun, which his grandfather and father both attended. Diana's father and brother both attended Eton. The royal family and the tabloid press agreed that William would be allowed to study free from intrusion in exchange for regular updates about his life. John Wakeham, chairman of the Press Complaints Commission, stated "Prince William is not an institution; nor a soap star; nor a football hero. He is a boy: in the next few years, perhaps the most important and sometimes painful part of his life, he will grow up and become a man." While at Eton, he often had tea on weekends at the nearby Windsor Castle with Queen Elizabeth, discussing state boxes and constitutional duties meant to "prepare [him] as future King."

On 3 June 1991, William was admitted to Royal Berkshire Hospital after being accidentally hit on the forehead by a fellow pupil wielding a golf club. He suffered a depressed fracture of the skull and was operated on at Great Ormond Street Hospital, resulting in a permanent scar. The incident received widespread media attention. In 1999, he underwent an operation on his left hand after he broke a finger. After completing his studies at Eton, William took a gap year, during which he took part in British Army training exercises in Belize, worked on English dairy farms, and visited Africa. As part of the Raleigh International programme in the town of Tortel in southern Chile, for ten weeks William worked on local construction projects and taught English. He lived with other young volunteers, sharing in the common household chores. His interest in African culture prompted him to teach himself Swahili.

In 2001, William enrolled at the University of St Andrews in Scotland. Similar to his time at Eton, the media agreed not to invade William's privacy, and students were warned not to leak stories to the press. he embarked on a degree course in Art History, later changing his main subject to Geography. William wrote his dissertation on the coral reefs of Rodrigues in the Indian Ocean and graduated with an undergraduate Master of Arts (MA Hons) degree with upper second class honours in 2005. While at university, he represented the Scottish national universities water polo team at the Celtic Nations tournament in 2004. He was known as "Steve" by other students to avoid any journalists overhearing and realising his identity.

Early adulthood and duties
At the age of 21, William was appointed a Counsellor of State; he first served in that capacity when the Queen attended the Commonwealth Heads of Government Meeting in 2003. In July 2005, he embarked on his first solo public engagements on an overseas tour of New Zealand, travelling to participate in World War II commemorations. According to author Tina Brown, he had, like his father, expressed a desire to become Governor-General of Australia. In 2009, the Queen set up a private office for William and Harry with David Manning as their adviser. Manning accompanied William on his first official tour in January 2010 as he toured Auckland and Wellington; William opened the new building of the Supreme Court of New Zealand and was welcomed by a Māori chief.  The visit spurred crowds of "many thousands", with positive  public reception compared to that of Diana's 1983 tour. In March 2011, William visited Christchurch, New Zealand, shortly after the earthquake, and spoke at the memorial service at Hagley Park on behalf of his grandmother. He also travelled to Australia to visit areas affected by flooding in Queensland and Victoria.

Upon graduation from university, William interned in land management at Chatsworth House and in banking at HSBC. To prepare for his eventual management of the Duchy of Cornwall, in 2014, he enrolled in a vocational agricultural management course at Cambridge, which was organised by the Cambridge Programme for Sustainability Leadership (CPSL), of which his father is patron.

Military and air ambulance service

Having decided to follow a military career, William was admitted to the Royal Military Academy Sandhurst in January 2006. As "Lieutenant Wales"—a name based on his father's title Prince of Wales—he followed his younger brother into the Blues and Royals as a troop commander in an armoured reconnaissance unit, after which he spent five months training for the post at Bovington Camp, Dorset.

William's position as second-in-line to the throne at the time cast doubts on his chances of seeing combat, which increased after Harry's 2007 deployment was cancelled due to "specific threats". William instead trained in the Royal Navy and Royal Air Force, obtaining his commission as a sub-lieutenant in the former and flying officer in the latter, both broadly equivalent to the army rank of lieutenant. After completing his training, William undertook an attachment with the Royal Air Force at RAF Cranwell. Upon completing the course he was presented with his RAF wings by his father, who had received his own wings after training at Cranwell. During this secondment, William flew to Afghanistan in a C-17 Globemaster that repatriated the body of Trooper Robert Pearson. William was then seconded to train with the Royal Navy. He completed an accelerated Naval Officer training course at the Britannia Royal Naval College. Whilst serving on HMS Iron Duke in June 2008, William participated in a £40m drug seizure in the Atlantic, north-east of Barbados. He was a part of the crew on the Lynx helicopter which helped seize 900 kg of cocaine from a speedboat.

In January 2009, William transferred his commission to the RAF and was promoted to Flight Lieutenant. He trained to become a helicopter pilot with the RAF's Search and Rescue Force. In January 2010, he graduated from the Defence Helicopter Flying School at RAF Shawbury. On 26 January 2010, he transferred to the Search and Rescue Training Unit at RAF Valley, Anglesey, to receive training on the Sea King search and rescue helicopter; he graduated in September 2010. This made him the first member of the British royal family since Henry VII to live in Wales.

William's first rescue mission as co-pilot of an RAF Sea King was a response to an emergency call from Liverpool Coastguard on 2 October 2010. In November 2011, he participated in a search-and-rescue mission involving a cargo ship that was sinking in the Irish Sea; William, as a co-pilot, helped rescue two sailors. William was deployed to the Falkland Islands for a six-week tour with No. 1564 Flight from February to March 2012. The Argentine government condemned William's deployment to the islands close to the 30th anniversary of the beginning of the Falklands War as a "provocative act". In June 2012, Prince William gained a qualification to be captain or pilot in command of a Sea King rather than a co-pilot. His active service as an RAF search-and-rescue pilot ended in September 2013. He conducted 156 search and rescue operations, which resulted in 149 people being rescued. He later became patron to the Battle of Britain Memorial Flight.

On 13 July 2015, William began working full-time as a pilot with the East Anglian Air Ambulance (EAAA) based at Cambridge Airport, which he felt was a natural progression from his previous search-and-rescue role. He donated his full salary to the EAAA charity. William required a civil pilot's licence and further training before being permitted begin his role. He underwent part of his training as an at Norwich Airport. William described working irregular shifts and dealing mostly with critical care cases. He also discussed the impact of witnessing intensive trauma and bereavement on his mental health and personal life. The BBC has written that William was "exposed to the National Health Service in a way that no other senior royal has been or possibly ever will be."

William left his position with EAAA in July 2017 to assume full-time royal duties. After supporting an anniversary campaign for London's Air Ambulance Charity in 2019, he became the charity's official patron in March 2020. In May 2020, he granted permission to the charity to use Kensington Palace's private lawn to refuel during the COVID-19 pandemic. To mark Air Ambulance Week 2020, he wrote a letter thanking air ambulance workers, stating his "profound respect" for the community, particularly during the "immeasurably difficult" outbreak. In February 2023, he became patron of the Wales Air Ambulance charity.

Marriage

In 2001, William met Catherine Middleton while they were students in residence at St Salvator's Hall at the University of St Andrews. She reportedly caught William's attention at a charity fashion show on campus. The couple began dating in 2003. During their second year, William shared a flat with Middleton and two other friends. From 2003 to 2005, they both resided at Balgove House on the Strathtyrum estate with two roommates. In 2004, the couple briefly split but continued their relationship soon afterwards.

The relationship was followed closely by the tabloid press. Media attention became so intense that William asked the press to keep their distance from Middleton. On 15 December 2006, Middleton and her family attended Prince William's Passing Out Parade at the Royal Military Academy Sandhurst. In April 2007, William and Middleton were reported to have split. Middleton and her family attended the Concert for Diana in July 2007 at Wembley Stadium, where she and Prince William sat two rows apart. The couple were subsequently reported to have "rekindled their relationship". Middleton was in attendance during the Order of the Garter procession ceremony at Windsor Castle in June 2008, where William was made a Royal Knight of the Garter. In June 2010, the couple moved into a cottage on the Bodorgan Estate in Anglesey, Wales, where they resided until 2014. 

The couple became engaged in October 2010 while on holiday in Kenya. Clarence House announced their engagement on 16 November. William gave his fianceé his mother's engagement ring. The wedding took place in Westminster Abbey on 29 April 2011. One million people lined the wedding procession route in London, while the global audience for the wedding was reported to be 300 million or more, with 26 million people watching the event live in the United Kingdom. Following their marriage, William and Catherine  used Nottingham Cottage as their London home until 2013, when £4.5 million renovations completed at Apartment 1A at Kensington Palace, which continues to be their official London residence. The couple were given Anmer Hall, on the Sandringham Estate, as a wedding gift from the Queen, where they lived from 2015 to 2017. Kensington Palace became the couple's main residence in 2017. In September 2022, William and his family moved to Adelaide Cottage in Windsor.

Catherine's first pregnancy was announced on 3 December 2012. She was admitted on 22 July 2013 to the Lindo Wing of St Mary's Hospital, London, where Prince William had been delivered. Later that day, she gave birth to Prince George. On 8 September 2014, it was announced that Catherine was pregnant with her second child. She was admitted on 2 May 2015 to the same hospital and gave birth to Princess Charlotte. Catherine's third pregnancy was announced on 4 September 2017; Prince Louis was born on 23 April 2018.

William and Catherine have owned two English Cocker Spaniels, named Lupo and Orla. William is the godfather of Prince Constantine Alexios of Greece and Denmark (b. 1998), a distant relation through his grandfather the Duke of Edinburgh; and Mia Tindall (b. 2014), the eldest child of his paternal cousin Zara Tindall.

Duke of Cambridge

In April 2011, William was created Duke of Cambridge, Earl of Strathearn, and Baron Carrickfergus were announced in anticipation of his wedding. In May 2011, William and Catherine met with US president Barack Obama and First Lady Michelle Obama at Buckingham Palace. The couple toured Canada in summer 2011, attending Canada Day celebrations on Parliament Hill; William delivered speeches at Quebec City Hall and Northwest Territories, the former entirely in French and the latter including phrases from the Na-Dene and Inuvialuktun languages. Following initial public indifference the couple drew crowds of up to half a million and were praised for their relateability, with William referred "comfortably" to as a prince of Canada by the CBC.

William and Catherine served as ambassadors for the 2012 Summer Olympics in London, during multiple sporting events throughout the games. In September 2012, they toured Singapore, Malaysia, Tuvalu, and the Solomon Islands as part of the Queen's Diamond Jubilee celebrations. The couple attended further commemorations of the Jubilee throughout the year, including the Thames Diamond Jubilee Pageant in July. William hosted his first investiture ceremony at Buckingham Palace in October 2013, an "extension of the Duke of Cambridge's public duties" after leaving the Royal Air Force. In April 2014, William and Catherine undertook a royal tour to New Zealand and Australia with their son, Prince George. The itinerary included visiting the Plunket Society for children and visiting fire-damaged areas in New South Wales. The tour was well-received by local press, with New Zealand prime minister John Key crediting the couple with alleviating republican sentiment. In August, William, Catherine, and Harry represented the royal family at World War I commemorations in Belgium. In December 2014, William and Catherine visited New York and Washington D.C, where he met with President Obama at the White House and made a speech at the World Bank condemning the illegal trade in wildlife.

In February 2015, William visited Japan, meeting with Emperor Akihito and Empress Michiko at the Imperial Palace and visiting survivors devastated by the 2011 tsunami. From 1 to 4 March, he visited the Chinese cities Beijing, Shanghai, and Yunnan and met with President Xi Jinping. It was the first royal visit to mainland China in almost three decades, with press referring to William's diplomacy as "deft" and "polished". In April 2016, William and his wife undertook a tour to India and Bhutan. Activities included visiting children's charities such as Childline India, as well as a visit to Lingkana Palace. Following press criticizing him as "work-shy", William stated that he "took [his] duty very seriously" and was focusing on fatherhood and air ambulance work. William and Catherine toured Canada once again in September 2016. Countries visited by the couple in 2017 include France, Poland, Germany, and Belgium. In January 2018, the couple visited Sweden and Norway. The visits, which were, like others, requested by the Foreign Office, were interpreted to benefit UK-European relations post Brexit. In June 2018, William toured Jordan, Israel and Palestine.

William and Catherine toured Pakistan in October 2019, which was the royal family's first visit to the country in 13 years. In March 2020, the couple carried out a three-day tour of Ireland, visiting County Meath, Kildare, and Galway. In October 2020, the couple met Ukrainian president Volodymyr Zelensky and First Lady Olena Zelenska, at Buckingham Palace, the first engagement held at the residence since the COVID-19 pandemic. On 1 November 2020, it was reported that William had tested positive for COVID-19 in April but decided not to alert the media to 'avoid alarming the nation'. The Daily Telegraph reported he had been "very ill" and had isolated away from his family; other sources say that he had not been seriously ill, not bed-ridden and working for most of the time. In December, the couple embarked on a tour of England, Scotland, and Wales via the British royal train "to pay tribute to the inspiring work" of communities and charities in 2020. Prime Minister Boris Johnson expressed his support, while Scottish first minister Nicola Sturgeon criticised the tour, citing travel restrictions; local governments were consulted before planning the tour. In William's capacity as Lord High Commissioner to the General Assembly of the Church of Scotland, the couple toured the country in May 2021. In Cornwall on 11 June 2021, William and Catherine attended the G7 summit for the first time.

In March 2022, William and Catherine embarked on a tour of Belize, The Bahamas and Jamaica as part of the Queen's Platinum Jubilee celebrations. They encountered political and press criticism, given his family's ancestral connections to colonialism and the Atlantic slave trade. Reparations for slavery emerged as a major demand of protesters during the couple's visit. William assured that the royal family would accept each country's decision on republicanism with "pride and respect". During the unveiling of the National Windrush Monument in London, William described the tour as "an opportunity to reflect" and condemned racism faced by both members of the Windrush generation and minorities in 2022.

In May 2022, William attended the State Opening of Parliament for the first time as a counsellor of state, where his father, the Prince of Wales, delivered the Queen's Speech on behalf of William's grandmother.

Prince of Wales

Queen Elizabeth died on 8 September 2022, and William's father ascended the throne as Charles III. William, now heir apparent, was announced as Prince of Wales by his father on 9 September. Controversy regarding the title became a topic of public debate in Wales. By 17 September, a petition calling for the end of the title had received over 30,000 signatures, while a YouGov poll showed 66% support for Prince William to be given the title compared to 22% opposed. On 30 October, Senedd Llywydd Elin Jones noted that an investiture is not a constitutional requirement and suggested that contemporary Wales would deem it unnecessary. Kensington Palace also stated an investiture is "not on the table". As the eldest son of the king, William has inherited the Duchy of Cornwall, which brings him an additional income. The duchy is "a £760 million (about US$1.25 billion) entity established in 1337" to provide a private income to the monarch's eldest son.

On 27 September 2022, William and Catherine visited Anglesey and Swansea, which marked their first visit to Wales since becoming Prince and Princess of Wales. William visited the Senedd in November 2022, meeting with Welsh first minister Mark Drakeford. In the same month, he and Catherine welcomed South African president Cyril Ramaphosa and attended a state dinner in honour of his visit. They made their first official visit to Cornwall as Duke and Duchess in February 2023, visiting Falmouth.

Charity work and interests

Humanitarian and environmental patronages 
William became aware of HIV/AIDS in the mid-1990s when he accompanied his mother and brother on visits to shelters and clinics for patients. In January 2005, William and his brother volunteered at a British Red Cross aid distribution centre to pack emergency supplies for countries affected by the 2004 Boxing Day tsunami. In May that year, he spent two weeks in North Wales with Mountain Rescue England and Wales (MREW). In May 2007, William became patron of MREW and president of the Royal Marsden Hospital, the latter of which was a role previously held by his mother.

In 2007, William and Harry organised the Concert for Diana, in memory of their mother, which benefitted the charities and patronages of Diana, William, and Harry. In October 2008, William and his brother embarked on the 1,000 mile eight-day Enduro Africa motorbike ride across South Africa to raise money for Sentebale, UNICEF and the Nelson Mandela Children's Fund. In 2010, he also became a patron of 100 Women in Hedge Funds Philanthropic Initiatives. William succeeded Lord Attenborough in 2010 as the fifth president of the British Academy of Film and Television Arts. In March 2011, William and Catherine set up a gift fund held by The Foundation of Prince William and Prince Harry to allow well-wishers to donate money to charities supporting the armed forces, children, the elderly, art, sport and conservation in lieu of gifts. The charity has since been renamed The Royal Foundation.

William has spoken out for LGBT rights as part of his work against cyberbullying, stating the importance of being "proud of the person you are" and discussing the effects of online abuse and discrimination. In 2016, he appeared in the July issue of Attitude and became the first member of the royal family to be featured on the cover of a gay magazine. He was recognised at the British LGBT Awards in May 2017.

In March 2020, William appeared in a video for the National Emergencies Trust, launching a fundraising appeal to help charities during the pandemic. The appeal raised £11 million in its first week, eventually totalling to £90 million, with the money going out to "front line charities" and to the UK Community Foundations to be distributed among "local community foundations". In April 2020, he officially became the patron of the organisation. In April 2020, he made a surprise appearance in The Big Night In, a 20 April 2020 telethon held during the COVID-19 pandemic, in a skit which he held a video call with Stephen Fry, who revised his role as (a descendant of) Lord Melchett, from the Blackadder series.

In December 2020, William and his wife became joint patrons of NHS Charities Together. In February 2021, William visited a vaccination centre in King's Lynn and later encouraged use of the vaccine, denouncing false information that could cause vaccine hesitancy. In May 2021, he got his first dose of COVID-19 vaccine by NHS staff at the Science Museum in London.

In September 2021, it was reported that William had helped an Afghan officer who was a graduate of the Royal Military Academy Sandhurst and an assistant to the British troops be evacuated from the Kabul airport along with more than 10 members of his family amid the 2021 Taliban offensive. In March 2022 and amid the Russian invasion of Ukraine, William and Catherine made a donation to help the refugees. In February 2023, they donated to the Disasters Emergency Committee (DEC) which was helping victims of the 2023 Turkey–Syria earthquake.

Conservation
 
Prince William became a patron of the Tusk Trust in December 2005, a charity that works towards conserving wildlife and initiating community development across Africa. He carried out his first official duty with the trust in launching a  bike ride across the African continent in 2008. Later, William helped with launching the Tusk Conservation Awards, which have been presented to selected environmental activists annually since 2013. In June 2010, William and his brother visited Botswana, Lesotho, and South Africa, visiting projects relating to wildlife, sport, and young children. William has occasionally commented on the effects of overpopulation on the wildlife of Africa, but his remarks have been criticised for not taking resource consumption and population density into consideration. In 2013, he succeeded his grandfather, the Duke of Edinburgh, as president of Fields in Trust. He established the United for Wildlife Transport Taskforce in December 2014, with the goal of reducing global illegal wildlife trade.

After two years of research, William launched the Earthshot Prize in October 2020, designed to provide funding and incentive for environmental solutions over the next decade. The Prize is slated to be given every year from 2021 until 2030 to five winners each year, in accordance with five categories detailing the restoration of nature, air cleanliness, ocean conservation, waste-free living, and climate change. Following the launch, William gave a TED Talk on environmental protection and conservation as part of the TED Countdown climate change initiative. Later that month, William took over the patronages of Fauna and Flora International and the British Trust for Ornithology, passed on from his grandparents. In the same month, he appeared in an ITV documentary titled Prince William: A Planet For Us All to discuss environmental issues.

In early 2021, William made a private donation to the Thin Green Line Foundation, which provides grants for the relatives of conservation park rangers that are killed every year while protecting wildlife. In July 2022, William condemned the murder of South African park ranger Anton Mzimba and asked for the responsible parties to "be brought to justice". In August 2022, he voiced his support for the 63-month prison sentence given in the United States to a man responsible for trafficking rhinoceros horns and elephant ivory. He had previously called for harsher punishments and penalties for poachers and smugglers at the Illegal Wildlife Trade Conference in 2018.

Mental health
Since 2009, William has been the patron of Child Bereavement UK, which provides support for children and families who have lost a loved one. In 2016, the Royal Foundation launched multiple mental health initiatives, including Heads Together, a campaign led by William, Catherine and Prince Harry to de-stigmatise mental health. Legacy programmes include Mental Health at Work, launched in September 2018 to change the approach to workplace mental health in the UK, as well as Heads Up, launched in May 2019 in partnership with the Football Association, utilising football to affect the conversation surrounding mental health in adults. Later that month, the couple together with William's brother and sister-in-law launched Shout, the UK's first 24/7 text messaging service for those who suffer from mental issues. William later volunteered on the crisis helpline during the COVID-19 lockdowns to provide support via text message. William attributes his interest in mental health to his experiences as an air ambulance pilot, his work with the homeless, veterans' welfare, and his wife's anti-addiction advocacy.

In late March 2020, William and Catherine  began supporting a new mental health initiative by the Public Health England amidst the coronavirus pandemic. In April 2020, the couple announced Our Frontline, an initiative providing mental health support to emergency medical workers. In September 2020, he established the Emergency Responders Senior Leaders Board, commissioned by the foundation to research the mental health and wellbeing of emergency responders. The project is in partnership with King's College London and the Open University. In May 2021 and 2022, William and Catherine voiced the Mental Health Minute message, which was broadcast on every radio station in the UK on and asked people to help individuals around them that suffer from loneliness. In October 2022 and to mark the World Mental Health Day, the couple took over Newsbeat and interviewed four guests on topics related to mental health.

Homelessness
In September 2005, William granted his patronage to Centrepoint, a charity that assists the homeless. In December 2009, as part of a Centrepoint-organised event, the prince spent the night in a sleeping bag near the Blackfriars Bridge to raise awareness of the experiences of homeless youth. He opened their new facility, Apprenticeship House, in November 2019 to mark their 50-year anniversary.

William has been patron of homelessness charity  The Passage since 2019 after first visiting the centre in 1992 with his mother. In October 2020, he wrote the introduction to the organisation's 40th-anniversary fundraising cookbook, discussing the importance of helping victims of homelessness during the COVID-19 pandemic. In December 2020, William volunteered at the charity to help prepare donation bags for homeless residents in emergency hotel accommodations and spoke with residents about their experiences. In March 2022, he was spotted selling copies of The Big Issue on the streets, copies of which are usually sold by homeless and unemployed people to collect money.

Sport

William often plays polo to raise money for charity. He is a fan of football, and supports the English club Aston Villa. He became president of England's Football Association in May 2006 and vice-royal patron of the Welsh Rugby Union (WRU) in February 2007, supporting the Queen as patron. The same year, the WRU's decision to name the Prince William Cup drew criticism as some believed it would have been more appropriate to name it after Ray Gravell. In December 2016, William became patron of the WRU.

In December 2010, William and British prime minister David Cameron attended a meeting with FIFA vice-president Chung Mong-joon at which Chung suggested a vote-trading deal for the right to host the 2018 World Cup in England. The English delegation reported the suggestion to FIFA, considering it a violation of anti-collusion rules. In 2011, William as president of the English FA, voted against Australia's 2022 FIFA bid and instead voted for South Korea; despite being the country's future heir. In 2020, he voted against the joint Australia–New Zealand 2023 FIFA Women's World Cup bid and instead voted for Colombia.

In February 2021, following an investigation into racism directed at Marcus Rashford, William released a statement as president of the FA, denouncing the "racist abuse... whether on the pitch, in the stands, or on social media" as "despicable" and stating that "we all have a responsibility" to create an environment of tolerance and accountability. In April 2021, William criticised the planned breakaway competition The Super League, adding that he "share[d] the concerns of fans about the proposed Super League and the damage it risks causing to the game we love." In July 2021, he condemned racist attacks against England football players following their loss at the UEFA Euro 2020 finale.

In May 2007, William became patron of the English Schools' Swimming Association. In 2012, together with his wife Catherine and brother Prince Harry, William launched Coach Core. The program was set up following the 2012 Olympics and provides apprenticeship opportunities for people who desire to pursue a career as a professional coach. In May 2020, he appeared in a BBC One Documentary titled Football, Prince William and Our Mental Health as a part of a campaign to promote men to discuss their mental issues using football as a common medium.

Both William and his brother are enthusiastic motorcyclists; William owns a Ducati 1198 S Corse. In May 2014, William, like his father and paternal grandfather, became president of the British Sub-Aqua Club (BSAC). He enthusiastically took part in a bandy event in Stockholm in January 2018.

In November 2022, William was criticised by Welsh football followers and the Welsh actor Michael Sheen for holding the Prince of Wales title whilst having affiliations with England football, particularly after he presented England jerseys to the squad in advance of the 2022 FIFA World Cup in which both Wales and England would be playing in the same Group B.

Public image
William is generally believed to be popular across Britain and the Commonwealth and has generally been known to be one of the most popular members of the British royal family since birth. He has been particularly praised for his work in launching and running the Earthshot Prize along with David Attenborough.

In April 2011, Time magazine listed him as one of the 100 Most Influential People in the World. In December 2022, he was found to be the most liked member of the royal family by statistics and polling company YouGov.

Privacy and the media
The death of William's mother while being chased by paparazzi in 1997 has influenced his attitude towards the media. William and his wife have asked that, when off-duty, their privacy should be respected.

In 2005, William spoke with ITV reporter Tom Bradby and concluded it was likely that their voicemails were being accessed. An investigation under Deputy Assistant Commissioner Peter Clarke concluded that the compromised voice mail accounts belonged to Prince William's aides, including Jamie Lowther-Pinkerton, and not the prince himself. However, Clive Goodman later stated that he had hacked William's phone on 35 occasions.

In 2005 and after his then-girlfriend Catherine Middleton was chased by the paparazzi on her way to a job interview, William consulted Middleton and her father and penned a legal letter to newspapers requesting that they respect her privacy. As media attention increased around the time of Middleton's 25th birthday in January 2007, he issued a public statement, mentioning that "the situation is proving unbearable for all those concerned." In October 2007, William issued a public statement via his press secretary complaining about the "aggressive pursuit" by "photographers on motorcycles, in vehicles and on foot" while he and Middleton were leaving a London nightclub and later driving in his car. Following the statement, Daily Mail, Daily Mirror, and Daily Express all decided against using the paparazzi photos of the couple, but The Sun published photos taken before the couple's car had left. The statement prompted the Press Complaints Commission (PCC) to issue a warning, asking editors not to publish photographs which were taken through harassment. In April 2009, William's lawyers obtained an apology from The Daily Star after the tabloid had claimed he had "wrecked" a $2m plane during pilot training.

In September 2012, the French edition of Closer and Italian gossip magazine Chi published photographs of Catherine sun-bathing topless while on holiday at the Château d'Autet in Provence. Analysts from The Times believed the photographs were taken from the D22 (Vaucluse) road half a kilometre from the pool—a distance that would require an 800-mm or a 1000-mm lens. On 17 September 2012, the Prince and Princess filed a criminal complaint with the French prosecution department and launched a claim for civil damages at the Tribunal de Grande Instance de Nanterre. The following day the courts granted an injunction against Closer prohibiting further publication of the photographs and announced a criminal investigation would be initiated. Under French law, punitive damages cannot be awarded but intrusions of privacy are a criminal offence. In September 2017, Closer was fined €100,000 and its editor Laurence Pieau and owner Ernesto Mauri were each fined €45,000.

In October 2014, William and Catherine sent a legal letter to a freelance photographer who had put their son George and his nanny "under surveillance", asking the individual to stop "harassing and following" them. In August 2015, Kensington Palace published a letter detailing what it stated were the "dangerous" and invasive efforts of the media to get paparazzi pictures of Prince George and Princess Charlotte. Jason Knauf, communications secretary to the couple, wrote the letter to media standards organisations in various countries.

In November 2016, William issued a statement supporting his brother Harry and his then girlfriend, Meghan Markle, following their complaints about the press intrusion, stating that he "understands the situation concerning privacy and supports the need for Prince Harry to support those closest to him."

In November 2018 and during a visit to the BBC studios in central London, William publicly criticised the social media firms' approach to handling "misinformation and conspiracy" and added, "Their self-image is so grounded in their positive power for good that they seem unable to engage in constructive discussion about the social problems they are creating".

In June 2022, a three-minute video of William confronting Terry Harris, a paparazzi photographer, was posted to Harris's YouTube channel. It was recorded by Harris in January 2021 and shows William arguing with Harris as he attempts to film his family on a bike ride near Anmer Hall. Kensington Palace described the video as a breach of the family's privacy and asked for it to be removed from public websites. The couple's lawyers also contacted the photographer, who claimed he was on public roads and had filmed the video after hearing about allegations that William and Catherine had broken the "rule of six" as they toured a public attraction at Sandringham while William's uncle and aunt, then Earl and Countess of Wessex, and their children happened to be in the same spot.

Titles, styles, honours, and arms

Titles and styles

William has been a British prince since birth. On his wedding day, 29 April 2011, his grandmother Elizabeth II created him Duke of Cambridge, Earl of Strathearn and Baron Carrickfergus. The letters patent granting these titles were issued on 26 May that year.

On the accession of his father on 8 September 2022, as the eldest son of the monarch, he automatically became Duke of Cornwall, Duke of Rothesay, Earl of Carrick, Baron of Renfrew, Lord of the Isles, and Prince and Great Steward of Scotland. On 9 September 2022, the King announced the creation of William as Prince of Wales; the letters patent granting this title and that of Earl of Chester were issued on 13 February 2023. The usage of the title Prince of Wales has been subject to some controversy over the past decades.

Two forms of address are in current use; in Scotland he is known by his highest Scottish title, Duke of Rothesay, and elsewhere by his highest British title, Prince of Wales.

Honours
He is a Royal Knight Companion of the Most Noble Order of the Garter (KG), a Knight of the Most Ancient and Most Noble Order of the Thistle (KT), a member of the Privy Council of the United Kingdom (PC), and a Personal Aide-de-Camp (ADC) to the sovereign.

Arms

Banners, flags, and standards

As Prince of Wales
The banners used by the Prince of Wales vary depending upon location. His personal standard is the Royal Standard of the United Kingdom differenced as in his arms with a label of three points Argent, and the escutcheon of the arms of the Principality of Wales in the centre. It is used outside Wales, Scotland, Cornwall, and Canada, and throughout the entire United Kingdom when the prince is acting in an official capacity associated with the UK Armed Forces.

The personal flag for use in Wales is based upon the Royal Badge of Wales (the historic arms of the Kingdom of Gwynedd), which consist of four quadrants, the first and fourth with a red lion on a gold field, and the second and third with a gold lion on a red field. Superimposed is an escutcheon Vert bearing the single-arched coronet of the Prince of Wales.

In Scotland, the personal banner used since 1974 is based upon three ancient Scottish titles: Duke of Rothesay (heir apparent to the King of Scots), High Steward of Scotland and Lord of the Isles. The flag is divided into four quadrants like the arms of the Chief of Clan Stewart of Appin; the first and fourth quadrants comprise a gold field with a blue and silver checkered band in the centre; the second and third quadrants display a black galley on a silver field. The arms are differenced from those of Appin by the addition of an inescutcheon bearing the tressured lion rampant of Scotland; defaced by a plain label of three points Azure to indicate the heir apparent.

In Cornwall, the banner is the arms of the Duke of Cornwall: "Sable 15 bezants Or", that is, a black field bearing 15 gold coins.

In Canada, a personal heraldic banner for the Prince of Wales was first issued in 2011, consisting of the shield of the Arms of Canada defaced with both a blue roundel of the Prince of Wales's feathers surrounded by a wreath of gold maple leaves, and a white label of three points.

Former standards

Prior to the accession of his father, William used a banner derived from his arms, for use outside of Scotland and Canada. There was a variation of this used when in Scotland. In 2011, the Canadian Heraldic Authority introduced a personal heraldic flag for the Duke of Cambridge's use in Canada. It is the Royal Arms of Canada in banner form defaced with a blue roundel surrounded with a wreath of gold maple leaves and shells within which is a depiction of a "W" surmounted by a coronet. Above the roundel is a white label of three points, charged with a red shell.)

Ancestry 
William's ancestry is royal and aristocratic. Patrilineally, he is a member of the House of Windsor and also descends from the House of Oldenburg, one of Europe's oldest royal houses. More specifically, he descends from the cadet branch known as the House of Glücksburg.

Through his mother, William descends from the Earls Spencera cadet branch of the Spencer family descended from the Earls of Sunderland; the senior branch are now also Dukes of Marlborough; the Barons Fermoy; and more anciently from Henry FitzRoy, 1st Duke of Grafton, and Charles Lennox, 1st Duke of Richmond—two illegitimate sons of King Charles II. As the monarch, William would be the first monarch since the death of Anne in 1714 to undisputedly descend from Charles I and the first to descend from Charles II.
	
William descends matrilineally from Eliza Kewark, a housekeeper for his eighteenth-century ancestor Theodore Forbes—a Scottish merchant who worked for the East India Company in Surat. She is variously described in contemporary documents as "a dark-skinned native woman", "an Armenian woman from Bombay", and "Mrs. Forbesian". Genealogist William Addams Reitwiesner assumed Kewark was Armenian. In June 2013, BritainsDNA announced that genealogical DNA tests on two of William's distant matrilineal cousins confirm Kewark was matrilineally of Indian descent.

Bibliography

Books
 HRH Prince William, Duke of Cambridge, "Preface", in: 
 HRH Prince William, "Introduction", in: 
 HRH The Duke of Cambridge, "Foreword", in: 
 HRH The Duke of Cambridge, "Foreword", in:

Authored letters and articles

See also
 Royal William, a German red rose named after Prince William shortly after his birth
 List of covers of Time magazine (1990s), (2010s)

Footnotes

References

Further reading

Books

Articles

External links

 The Prince of Wales at the official website of the British royal family
 The Duke of Cornwall at the Duchy of Cornwall website
 The Prince of Wales at the website of the Government of Canada
 
 
 

|-

|-

|-

|-

|-

|-

 
1982 births
Living people
20th-century British people
21st-century British Army personnel
21st-century Royal Air Force personnel
21st-century Royal Navy personnel
Alumni of the University of St Andrews
Blues and Royals officers
British Anglicans
British environmentalists
British geographers
British humanitarians
British male water polo players
British polo players
Cambridge, William
Dukes of Cambridge
Dukes of Cornwall
Dukes of Rothesay
Earls or mormaers of Strathearn
Family of Charles III
Graduates of the Royal Military Academy Sandhurst
Helicopter pilots
Heirs to the British throne
Heirs apparent
House of Windsor
Knights of the Garter
Knights of the Thistle
Members of the Privy Council of the United Kingdom
Middleton family (British)
Mountbatten-Windsor family
People from London
People educated at Eton College
People educated at Ludgrove School
People educated at Wetherby School
Presidents of the Football Association
Princes of the United Kingdom
Princes of Wales
Royal Air Force squadron leaders
Royal Navy officers
Sons of kings